Breakthrough is a 2019 American Christian drama film directed by Roxann Dawson in her feature film directorial debut. The film was written by Grant Nieporte, based on the Christian book, The Impossible, an account of true events written by Joyce Smith with Ginger Kolbaba. It stars Chrissy Metz, Josh Lucas, Topher Grace, Mike Colter, Marcel Ruiz, Sam Trammel, and Dennis Haysbert with a cameo by Phil Wickham and Lecrae. Stephen Curry and Samuel Rodriguez are executive producers.

The film tells the story of a St. Louis teenager who slipped through an icy lake on January 19, 2015 and was underwater for 15 minutes before resuscitative efforts were started. Although being rescued, he is in a coma, and his family must rely on their faith to get through the ordeal.

Breakthrough premiered in St. Louis on March 20, 2019, and was released in the United States on April 17, 2019, by Walt Disney Studios Motion Pictures through their 20th Century Fox label. It is the studio's first feature film after the acquisition of 21st Century Fox by Disney. The film received mixed reviews from critics, who praised the performances and inspirational messages but called the plot predictable. The film garnered a nomination at the 92nd Academy Awards for Best Original Song.

Plot
John Smith (Ruiz) is a 14-year-old Guatemalan boy raised in Lake St. Louis, Missouri by his adoptive parents, Brian (Lucas) and Joyce Smith (Metz). Though they are loving and supportive, John struggles with feelings of abandonment from his birth parents, and rebels against his parents and teachers.

In school, John's class is assigned to give a presentation about their family backgrounds. On his day to present, John admits he did not do the assignment. His basketball coach, who had promised him a starting position, warns John that if he gets a failing grade, he will be benched. John later gives a half-hearted presentation, saying that everyone already knows he is adopted and he does not know much about his true background.

Later, John and his friends Josh and Reiger go out onto a frozen lake, ignoring a neighbor's warning. The resident calls the police, and all three boys fall through the ice. Josh and Reiger manage to swim to the surface and are swiftly rescued by first responders. Two of the rescuers dive in, but are unable to find John. As they are about to give up, one of the rescuers, Tommy Shine (Colter), hears a voice telling him to go back. Thinking it is his chief, he tries again, and manages to lift John to the surface.

With no pulse or breath, John is taken to the local hospital where an emergency team works frantically to save his life. After John still fails to register a pulse, the attending physician Dr. Sutterer gives Joyce a chance to say goodbye. A weeping Joyce cradles her son in her arms, pleading with the Holy Spirit to not let John die, at which point a faint pulse registers. Sutterer recommends transferring John to a better equipped hospital, citing Dr. Garrett (Haysbert) as an expert in cases like John's.

After John is transferred and placed in a medically-induced coma, Garrett warns his parents that he has little hope for John's recovery, and that if John were to pull through, he would likely live in a persistent vegetative state. Jason Noble (Grace), the family's new liberal pastor with whom Joyce has frequently clashed, visits the hospital and Joyce slowly warms to him. Like Joyce, he regards John's progress as divine intervention. John shows some signs of consciousness: he is able to hear Joyce and Noble and to respond with squeezes to the hand, and a tear trickles from his eye as a crowd gathers outside the hospital to sing and to pray for his recovery.

Joyce turns John's possible recovery into an obsession, harassing his health care professionals and alienating those around her, including her husband. In a heated moment, Joyce tells Brian that if not for her, John would be dead. After a brief and hurtful rebuttal, Brian storms off. Realizing she cannot control John's outcome, Joyce retreats to the roof of the hospital to pray, asking God for forgiveness and submitting to His will. It begins to snow, which she believes is an answer. She and Brian meet with Garrett, who tells them that the drugs they have been administering are becoming toxic to John's system and may be doing more harm than good. Joyce, who had been adamant about saving John's life at all costs, suggests stopping treatment and bringing him out of the coma, stating that she is ready for whatever fate brings. Garrett agrees.

John is revived and slowly regains consciousness, reliving his accident. He hears his mother's voice and opens his eyes, with full cognitive ability. A few days later he is discharged from the hospital, returning home and then back to school.

John's return though welcomed by many, is met with some resentment by others, who question why John's life was spared while their own loved ones died. This weighs on John's mind, he returns to the lake. There he sees Tommy Shine, and thanks him for saving his life. Tommy admits that he did not believe in God until after a series of protracted events since John's accident, and all he did was pull John from the water.

John reconciles his survival with a renewed sense of purpose in his life and rebuilds his relationships with those he had been alienating. An epilogue reveals that John is pursuing a career in ministry after graduating from high school.

Cast
 Chrissy Metz as Joyce Smith, a highly devout Christian woman, Brian's wife and John's adoptive mother.
 Josh Lucas as Brian Smith, Joyce's husband and John's adoptive father.
 Topher Grace as Pastor Jason Noble, Paula’s husband, the father of their son and daughter and the local pastor who tries to connect with the youth.
 Mike Colter as Tommy Shine, a first responder who had a moment with God to save John.
 Marcel Ruiz as John Smith, Joyce and Brian's Guatemalan 14-year-old adoptive son who makes a miraculous recovery.
 Sam Trammell as Kent Sutterer, Abby’s father.
 Dennis Haysbert as Dr. Garrett
 Maddy Martin as Abby Sutterer, Kent Sutterer's daughter and John's love interest.
 Isaac Kragten as Josh, one of John's friends.
 Nikolas Dukic as Reiger, one of John's friends.
 Travis Bryant as Jonah, one of John’s friends.
 Taylor Mosby as Chayla, one of John's friends.
 Ali Skovbye as Emma, one of John's friends.
 Chuck Shamata as Fire Chief
 Nancy Sorel as Mrs. Abbott, the Family History teacher at the Christian middle school John and his friends attend.
 Lisa Durupt as Paula Noble, Pastor Jason's wife and mother of his son and daughter.
 Rebecca Staab as Cindy Rieger.

Production
Producer DeVon Franklin helped the Smith family find a literary agent and then develop the book in a film after it was published. The movie was filmed in Manitoba from March to May 2018. Locations for the 31-day shoot included Winnipeg, Selkirk, and Portage la Prairie.

Marketing
An official trailer for the film was released on December 5, 2018 and received more than 30 million views within two days, becoming the most-viewed trailer for a religious film within that timespan.

Metz performed "I'm Standing With You" from the film's soundtrack at the 54th Academy of Country Music Awards alongside Carrie Underwood, Lauren Alaina, Maddie & Tae and Mickey Guyton.

Release
Breakthrough was released in the United States by Walt Disney Studios Motion Pictures (through their subsidiary 20th Century Fox) on April 17, 2019; it is also the first film from Fox under the ownership of The Walt Disney Company after its acquisition of 21st Century Fox on March 20, 2019. The Easter weekend it was released had the lowest box office receipts since 2005, because studios chose to avoid any major release during that period so as not to compete with Disney's release of Avengers: Endgame the following weekend.

The film was released on DVD, Blu-ray and 4K Blu-ray by 20th Century Fox Home Entertainment which became the label of Walt Disney Studios Home Entertainment on July 16, 2019.

Reception

Box office
Breakthrough grossed $40.7 million in the United States and Canada, and $9.7 million in other territories (including $5.9 million in Brazil), for a worldwide total of $50.4 million.

In the United States and Canada, the film was released alongside Penguins, and was projected to gross $13–17 million from 2,300 theaters in its five-day opening weekend. The film made $1.9 million on its first day and $1.5 million on its second. It went on to debut to $11.3 million (a five-day total of $14.6 million), finishing third behind The Curse of La Llorona and Shazam!. In its second weekend the film fell 39% to $6.8 million, finishing fourth.

Critical response
According to the review aggregator Rotten Tomatoes, 62% of critics have given the film a positive review based on 65 reviews; the average rating is 5.60/10. The website's critics consensus reads, "Like its lead character, Breakthrough is fiercely focused on faith – but its less subtle elements are balanced by strong performances and an uplifting story." At Metacritic, the film has a weighted average score of 46 out of 100, based on 17 critics, indicating "mixed or average reviews". Audiences polled by CinemaScore gave the film an average grade of "A" on an A+ to F scale, while those at PostTrak gave it a 4.5 out of 5 stars and a "definite recommend" of 69%.

Accolades

References

External links 
 
 

2019 films
2019 drama films
20th Century Fox films
TSG Entertainment films
American drama films
Films about Christianity
Films based on non-fiction books
Films set in 2015
American films based on actual events
Films set in Missouri
Films shot in Manitoba
Medical-themed films
Films scored by Marcelo Zarvos
2019 directorial debut films
2010s English-language films
2010s American films